The Four Kingdoms of Andalusia ( or, in 18th-century orthography) was a collective name designating the four kingdoms of the Crown of Castile located in the southern Iberian Peninsula, south of the Sierra Morena. These kingdoms were annexed from other states by the Kingdoms of Castille during the Reconquista: the Kingdom of Córdoba was conquered in 1236, the Kingdom of Jaén in 1246, the Kingdom of Seville in 1248 and the Kingdom of Granada in 1492.

The name was used in some contexts at least since the middle of the 18th century.

Notes

See also 
 Hermandad General de Andalucía

References 
 Juan Eslava Galán: El ámbito territorial del Reino de Jaén: una cuestión de geografía histórica, Boletín del Instituto de Estudios Giennenses, ISSN 0561-3590, Nº. 112, 1982, pp. 83–96

History of Andalusia